This is a list of football teams based in Merseyside sorted by which league they play in as of the 2018–19 season. The leagues are listed in order of their level in the English football league system.

Levels 1–4

These Merseyside clubs play in fully professional leagues, comprising levels 1–4 of the English football league system: the Premier League and the Football League. Following the relegation of Tranmere in 2015, Everton and Liverpool became the only two remaining Merseyside teams in professional leagues. Matches between them are known as the Merseyside derby. However, Tranmere Rovers returned to the Football League after three seasons away. Thanks to a 2-1 victory in the National League Play Off Final against Boreham Wood at Wembley in 2018.  The 2018/19 season saw them advance through the League Two playoffs, and reach League One.

Levels 5–8
These Merseyside clubs play in semi-pro leagues which are at a level in the English football league system that grants eligibility to enter the FA Trophy, comprising levels 5–8 of the system: the National League and the Northern Premier League.

Levels 9–10
These Merseyside clubs play in semi-pro and amateur leagues which grant eligibility to enter the FA Vase and are high enough in the English football league system to grant eligibility to enter the FA Cup, comprising levels 9–10 of the system. In Merseyside this consists solely of the North West Counties Football League.

References

Lists of football clubs in England
 
Football clubs